Dadhburzmihr (also spelled Dadmihr or Dazmihr) was the independent ruler (ispahbadh) of Tabaristan. He succeeded his father Farrukhan the Great in 728 and reigned until his death in 740/1. According to the 13-century Iranian historian Ibn Isfandiyar, Dadhburzmihr enjoyed a peaceful reign, facing no invasions from the Arab Caliphate, due to their attention being directed towards local revolts. His 6 year old son, Khurshid succeeded him.

References

Sources 
 
 
  
 

7th-century births
740 deaths
741 deaths
8th-century rulers in Asia
8th-century Iranian people
Dabuyid dynasty
Slave owners